List of communities in the  Halifax Regional Municipality, Nova Scotia

Communities are ordered by the highway upon which they are located.  All routes start with the terminus located near the largest community.

Trunk Routes

Trunk 1: Bedford - Lower Sackville  - Middle Sackville  - Upper Sackville
Trunk 2: Halifax - Bedford - Waverley - Fall River - Fletchers Lake - Wellington - Grand Lake - Oakfield - Enfield
Trunk 3: Halifax - Beechville - Lakeside - Timberlea - Hubley - Lewis Lake - Upper Tantallon - Head of St. Margarets Bay -  Boutilier's Point - Ingramport - Black Point - Queensland - Hubbards
Trunk 7: Bedford - Dartmouth - Westphal - East Preston - Lake Echo - Porters Lake - Head of Chezzetcook - Gaetz Brook - Musquodoboit Harbour - Smiths Settlement - Head of Jeddore - Salmon River Bridge - Oyster Pond - Lake Charlotte - Beech Hill - Ship Harbour - East Ship Harbour - Murphy Cove - Pleasant Harbour - Tangier - Popes Harbour - Spry Harbour - Spry Bay - Mushaboom - Sheet Harbour - Sheet Harbour 36 - Sheet Harbour - Watt Section - Beaver Harbour - Port Dufferin - West Quoddy - East Quoddy - Harrigan Cove - Moosehead - Moser River - Necum Teuch - Ecum Secum
Trunk 32: Halifax
Trunk 33: Lower Sackville - Bedford

Collector Roads

Route 207: West Chezzetcook - Grand Desert - Seaforth  - Three Fathom Harbour - East Lawrencetown  - Lawrencetown - Cole Harbour - Dartmouth
Route 212: Goffs - Devon - Antrim - Wyse's Corner - Elderbank
Route 213: Bedford - Hammond's Plains - Wallace Hill 14 - Hammonds Plains - Stillwater Lake - Upper Tantallon
Route 224: Sheet Harbour - Marinette  - Beaver Dam  - Pleasant Valley - Mill Lake - Upper Musquodoboit - Greenwood - Elmsvale - Middle Musquodoboit - Chaswood - Cooks Brook
Route 253: Halifax - Fergusons Cove - Herring Cove
Route 277: Lantz - Dutch Settlement - Carrolls Corner
Route 306: Halifax - Harrietsfield - Williamswood - Sambro
Route 318: Dartmouth - Waverley
Route 322: Dartmouth - Shearwater - Eastern Passage - Cow Bay - Cole Harbour
Route 333: Halifax - Goodwood - Hatchet Lake  - White's Lake  - Shad Bay  - Bayside  - Blind Bay - Big Lake - East Dover - West Dover  - Peggys Cove Preservation Area  - Indian Harbour  - Hackett's Cove  - Glen Margaret  - Seabright  - French Village  - Glen Haven  - Tantallon - Upper Tantallon
Route 336: - Upper Musquodoboit - Dean
Route 349: - Halifax - Herring Cove - Halibut Bay - Bear Cove - Portuguese Cove - Duncans Cove - Ketch Harbour - Sambro Head - Sambro
Route 354: Lower Sackville - Beaver Bank
Route 357: Musquodoboit Harbour - Meaghers Grant  - Elderbank - Middle Musquodoboit
Route 374: Sheet Harbour - Malay Falls - Lochaber Mines - Liscomb Sanctuary - Trafalgar

Communities located on rural roads

Bald Rock
Barkhouse Settlement
Brookside
Caribou Mines
Chaplin
Clam Harbour
College Lake
Conrod Settlement
Debaies Cove
East Chezzetcook
East Jeddore
East Loon Lake Village
East Pennant
East Petpeswick
Glenmore
Governor Lake
Higginsville
Jacket Lake
Kinsac
Lake Egmont
Lindsey Lake
Little Harbour
Long Lake
Lower East Chezzetcook
Lower Prospect
Lower Ship Harbour
Lower Three Fathom Harbour
Lucasville
Middle Porters Lake
Mineville
Mitchell Bay
Montague Gold Mines
Moose River Gold Mines
Mooseland
Murchyville
Myers Point
Newcomb Corner
North Preston
Oldham
Ostrea Lake
Pace Settlement
Pleasant Point
Prospect
Prospect Bay
River Lake
Sambro Creek
Sober Island
Southwest Cove
Ten Mile Lake
Terence Bay
Third Lake
Upper Lakeville
West Jeddore
West Loon Lake
West Pennant
West Petpeswick
West Porters Lake

Halifax Regional Municipality
Communities in Halifax County, Nova Scotia

Communities